Damot Pulasa is a woreda in Southern Nations, Nationalities, and Peoples' Region, Ethiopia. Part of the Wolayita Zone Damot Pulasa is bordered on the east and south by Damot Gale, on the west by the Boloso Sore, and on the north by the Hadiya Zone. Damot Pulasa was separated from Damo Gale woreda. The administrative center of the woreda is Shanto town

Demographics 
Based on the 2019 population projection conducted by the CSA, this woreda has a total population of 135,760, of whom 66,463 are men and 69,297 women; 5,346 or 5.08% of its population are urban dwellers. The majority of the inhabitants were Protestants, with 73.72% of the population reporting that belief, 17.1% were Roman Catholic, and 8.17% practiced Ethiopian Orthodox Christianity.

Notes 

Wolayita
Districts of the Southern Nations, Nationalities, and Peoples' Region